Andreas Ulmer (born 30 October 1985) is an Austrian professional footballer who plays as a defender for and captains Austrian Bundesliga club Red Bull Salzburg. He represents the Austria national team.

Club career
Born in Linz, Ulmer joined the Frank Stronach Akademie to make his professional debut for Austria Wien in the 2004–2005 season. In summer 2008, he joined SV Ried. On 28 January 2009, it was announced that Ulmer was transferred to Red Bull Salzburg with immediate effect. During the 2017–18 season, Salzburg had their best ever European campaign. They finished top of their Europa League group, for a record fourth time, before beating Real Sociedad and Borussia Dortmund thus making their first ever  appearance in the UEFA Europa League semi-final. On 3 May 2018, he played in the Europa League semi-finals as Olympique de Marseille played out a 1–2 away loss but a 3–2 aggregate win to secure a place in the 2018 Europa League Final.

Career statistics

Club

1.Includes UEFA Champions League and UEFA Europa League.

Honours
Austria Wien
Austrian Bundesliga: 2005–06

Red Bull Salzburg
Austrian Bundesliga (12): 2008–09, 2009–10, 2011–12, 2013–14, 2014–15, 2015–16, 2016–17, 2017–18, 2018–19, 2019–20, 2020–21, 2021–22
Austrian Cup (9): 2011–12, 2013–14, 2014–15, 2015–16, 2016–17, 2018–19, 2019–20, 2020–21, 2021–22

Individual
Austrian Bundesliga Player of the Year: 2016–17
Austrian Bundesliga Team of the Year: 2017–18, 2018–19, 2019–20, 2020–21, 2021–22

References

External links

 Player profile at Austria-Archiv.at
 
 Guaridan Football Stats

1985 births
Living people
Footballers from Linz
Association football defenders
Austrian footballers
Austria international footballers
SV Ried players
FK Austria Wien players
FC Red Bull Salzburg players
Austrian Football Bundesliga players
2. Liga (Austria) players
UEFA Euro 2020 players